Better Days is the fifth studio album by Texas singer-songwriter Guy Clark, released in 1983.

The LP contains one hit single, "Homegrown Tomatoes," which reached No. 42 on the U.S. Billboard Country chart. The song was covered by John Denver in 1988 on his LP Higher Ground.

Track listing
All songs written by Guy Clark except as noted.
 "Blowin' Like a Bandit" – 2:40
 "Better Days" – 3:05
 "Homegrown Tomatoes" – 2:58
 "Supply & Demand" – 3:16
 "The Randall Knife" – 4:13
 "The Carpenter" – 3:08
 "Uncertain Texas" (Guy Clark, Rodney Crowell) – 2:29
 "No Deal" (Townes Van Zandt) – 3:19
 "Tears" – 2:49
 "Fool in the Mirror" – 3:35

Personnel
Guy Clark – vocals, guitar
Glen D. Hardin – keyboards
Tony Brown – keyboards
Rodney Crowell – background vocals
Paul Kennerley – bass, background vocals
Hank DeVito – guitar, pedal steel guitar
Vince Gill – guitar, background vocals
Johnny Gimble – fiddle, mandolin
Emory Gordy – guitar, bass
Larrie Londin – drums
Gary Nicholson – guitar
Reggie Young – guitar

Production notes
Rodney Crowell – producer
Bradley Hartman – engineer
Tim Farmer – assistant engineer
Glenn Meadows – original mastering
Danny Mundhenk – assistant engineer
Paul Brookside – liner notes

Chart performance

References

External links
 LP Discography web site.

1983 albums
Guy Clark albums
Warner Records albums
Albums produced by Rodney Crowell